Aguas Andinas is a water supply and sanitation company that operates in Chile. Aguas Andinas has been controlled by the Spanish company Agbar since 2008. The company owns ESSAL, a subsidiary in Los Lagos and Los Ríos regions of southern Chile.

References

Water companies of Chile
Companies based in Santiago
Chilean companies established in 1977